USS Ebert (DE-768) was a  in service with the United States Navy from 1944 to 1946. In 1951, she was transferred to Greece, where she served as Ierax (D31) until 1991. She was finally sunk as a target in 2002.

Namesake
Hilan Ebert was born on 21 March 1903 in Alliance, Ohio. Lieutenant Commander Ebert was killed on 30 November 1942 when his ship was torpedoed in the Battle of Tassafaronga off Guadalcanal. He was posthumously awarded the Navy Cross.

History

United States Navy (1944-1951)
Ebert was launched on 11 May 1944 by Tampa Shipbuilding Co., Inc., Tampa, Florida; sponsored by Mrs. Hilan Ebert, widow of Lieutenant Commander Ebert; and commissioned on 12 July 1944.

Ebert guarded the passage of convoys carrying men and supplies vital to victory in Europe, to ports in Great Britain and France, between 6 October 1944 and 14 May 1945, then returned to New York City to prepare for duty in the Pacific.

She sailed on 8 June for Pearl Harbor, Eniwetok, and the Philippines. She escorted convoys carrying occupation troops to Japan, until 30 November when she left Manila for the United States.

Hellenic Navy (1951-2002)

Ebert was placed out of commission in reserve at Green Cove Springs, Florida, on 14 June 1946. Towed to Boston, Massachusetts, in November 1950, Ebert was transferred to Greece on 1 March 1951 under the Mutual Defense Assistance Program.

She served in the Greek Navy as Ierax (D31) (Hawk), and was stricken in 1991. In January 1998, reports emerged that she was laid up in terminal reserve at the port of Souda, in Crete. Ierax was sunk as part of a Naval exercise (combination of Penguin missile and torpedo attack) in July 2002.

References

External links

 

Cannon-class destroyer escorts of the United States Navy
Ships built in Tampa, Florida
1944 ships
World War II frigates and destroyer escorts of the United States
Wild Beast-class destroyers (1951)